Ratan Singh was the ruling Maharaja of the princely state of Bharatpur from 1768 to 1769.

He ascended the throne after the death of Maharaja Jawahar Singh. Jawahar Singh had no son, hence he was succeeded by his brother, Ratan Singh. During a Holi festival held in Vrindavan, possibly drunk Ratan Singh was killed by a dwarf in Bharatpur a very dilapidated "Ratan Chhatri" is still present. His son Maharaja Kehri Singh succeeded him in 1769.

References

Jat rulers
Rulers of Bharatpur state
1769 deaths
Year of birth unknown
Jat